Barbara Meislin (known as the Purple Lady of Tiburon) is an American author, singer, philanthropist, and healer, known locally in the town of Tiburon, California, for a devotion to things colored purple.

Biography

Meislin was born to a single mother in Newark, New Jersey, in approximately 1936. She trained as a teacher at Hunter College, taught high school and adult education French and Spanish in Tiburon. After learning guitar as an adult she became an "accomplished" singer, taught the instrument at Dominican College, had a radio show on KQED playing French music, and played local restaurants, singing in French, Hebrew, and English. She recorded an album of music for healing. She divorced her husband, Jerry Meislin, on amicable terms in 1982.

In October 2009, the large purple house where she had lived for 43 years, a local landmark, burned down.

Career
She wrote and self-published a successful book, No One Can Ever Steal Your Rainbow, as well as a song by that name, on the occasion of the death of her daughter, Lori, from a rare childhood virus. The title was taken from a comment by her rabbi, who was consoling her after her purple mailbox was stolen (it was later returned). The book was later adapted as a ballet that premiered at the Marin Dance Theater.

Public works
Meislin is also known for her charitable work. She is an ardent supporter of TRUST-Emun - Womens Interfaith Network; variously founded, and donated the money to build, a hospice library, a "Purple Playground of Friendship" for both Jewish and Palestinian children in Neve Shalom / Wahat al-Salam near Latrun, Israel, a "Positively Purple for the Breast Cancer" fashion show and fundraiser, She also donated a gazebo for a local park and each year, since 2000 she has paid for hundreds of mentors and kids involved in Big Brothers Big Sisters of the North Bay to go ice skating at Snoopy's Home Ice Rink in Santa Rosa, California.

Purple
Meislin is known for her love for the color purple, and related shades of violet, lavender, amethyst, lilac, mauve, magenta, and indigo. Most of her possessions are a shade of purple, including among other things:
her make-up
her automobiles (license plates contain the word "Purple")
her cell phone
a garden with purple flowers
her art collection

References

External links

Supernatural healing
Living people
People from Tiburon, California
People from Newark, New Jersey
1930s births
Jewish American philanthropists
21st-century American Jews